The following is a list of state highways in the U.S. state of Louisiana designated in the 3200-3249 range.


Louisiana Highway 3201

Louisiana Highway 3202

Louisiana Highway 3203

Louisiana Highway 3205

Louisiana Highway 3206

Louisiana Highway 3209

Louisiana Highway 3210

Louisiana Highway 3210 (LA 3210) runs  in a north–south direction from LA 1242 to the concurrent US 425 and LA 15 in Chase, Franklin Parish.  It is part of the original two-lane alignment of LA 15 bypassed around 1982.

LA 3210 heads north from LA 1242 at a point immediately east of the latter's intersection with US 425/LA 15.  The route travels through the small community of Chase and intersects LA 866.  Shortly afterward, LA 3210 reaches its terminus as it rejoins the divided four-lane US 425/LA 15.  LA 3210 is an undivided two-lane highway for its entire length.

Louisiana Highway 3211

Louisiana Highway 3211 (LA 3211) runs  in a southwest to northeast direction along Northwest Boulevard from US 90 to LA 182 in Franklin, St. Mary Parish.  The route connects Franklin with the US 90 freeway.

Louisiana Highway 3212

Louisiana Highway 3213

Louisiana Highway 3213 (LA 3213) runs  in a north–south direction from LA 3127 west of Edgard to the junction of LA 641 and LA 3125 east of Gramercy, St. James Parish.  The route consists largely of the Veterans Memorial Bridge, commonly known as the Gramercy Bridge, and its approaches.

LA 3213 heads northeast from LA 3127 and crosses from St. James Parish into St. John the Baptist Parish.  After curving to the northeast, the highway has a folded diamond interchange with LA 18 just before ascending onto the Mississippi River bridge at Wallace.  Midway across the river, LA 3213 crosses back into St. James Parish and has a similar interchange with LA 44 but with the northbound exit having to cross the opposite carriageway at grade.  LA 3213 proceeds northward, running parallel to the eastern limit of Gramercy, and ends at a junction with LA 641 and LA 3125.  The former continues straight ahead to connections with US 61 and I-10.  LA 3213 is an undivided two-lane highway south of the LA 18 exit and a divided four-lane highway otherwise.

Louisiana Highway 3214

Louisiana Highway 3214 (LA 3214) runs  in an east–west direction from LA 44 to LA 3125 north of Convent, St. James Parish.  The route is a short connector that is also the location of an Occidental Chemical Corporation facility.  It is an undivided two-lane highway for its entire length.

Louisiana Highway 3215

Louisiana Highway 3215 (LA 3215) runs  in a north–south direction from US 90 to LA 182 in Garden City, St. Mary Parish.  The route is a short connector between US 90 and its pre-freeway alignment (LA 182) between Franklin and Centerville.  It is an undivided two-lane highway for its entire length.

Louisiana Highway 3217

Louisiana Highway 3217 (LA 3217) runs  in an east–west direction from LA 628 to US 61 in LaPlace, St. John the Baptist Parish.  The route is a short connector located on the southeast side of LaPlace just east of the Bonnet Carre Spillway.  It is an undivided two-lane highway for its entire length.

Louisiana Highway 3218

Louisiana Highway 3218 (LA 3218) runs  in an east–west direction from US 80 west of Delta to the foot of the Old Vicksburg Bridge across the Mississippi River at Delta, Madison Parish.

The route is the state-maintained approach to the bridge, built in 1930 and now closed to vehicular traffic.  It was part of US 80 before that highway was re-routed onto the parallel I-20 bridge into Vicksburg, Mississippi in 1980.  LA 3218 is an undivided two-lane highway for its entire length.

Louisiana Highway 3219

Louisiana Highway 3219 (LA 3219) runs  in a north–south direction from LA 3127 to LA 18 at Lagan, St. James Parish.  The route is a short connector in an area commonly known as St. James.

Louisiana Highway 3220

Louisiana Highway 3220 (LA 3220) runs  and consists of the Belle Vue Swing Bridge over Bayou Lafourche that connects LA 1 and LA 308 south of Lockport, Lafourche Parish.  The bridge was constructed in 1986 and carries two lanes of traffic.

Louisiana Highway 3223

Louisiana Highway 3224

Louisiana Highway 3225

Louisiana Highway 3225 (LA 3225) runs  in a southeast to northwest direction from the concurrent US 71 and US 167 to a second junction with US 71 northwest of Pineville, Rapides Parish.  It was the original route of US 71 and US 167, as well as the earlier Jefferson Highway auto trail, before being moved onto the present freeway alignment in 1981.

LA 3225 heads north from a diamond interchange with US 71 and US 167 in an area north of Pineville known as Tioga.  Curving to the northwest, the route intersects LA 623 (Singer Drive) and LA 1204, which both head to nearby Ball, located on US 165.  LA 3225 then has a second intersection with US 167 at the southern limit of Creola.  The highway curves to the south and shortly reaches its terminus at US 71, just west of where it splits from US 167.  LA 3225 is an undivided two-lane highway for its entire length.

Louisiana Highway 3226

Louisiana Highway 3227

Louisiana Highway 3227 (LA 3227) runs  in an east-west direction from LA 157 in Haughton to LA 164 east of Haughton. It is an undivided two-lane highway for its entire length.

Louisiana Highway 3228

Louisiana Highway 3228 (LA 3228) ran  in a north–south direction along Asbury Drive from US 190 in Mandeville to a point on the US 190 east frontage road just north of Mandeville, St. Tammany Parish.  It is a remnant of the original alignment of US 190 before it became a controlled-access highway in the 1980s.

The route was transferred to local control in 2018 as part of La DOTD's Road Transfer Program.  LA 3228 was an undivided two-lane highway for its entire length.

Louisiana Highway 3229

Louisiana Highway 3231

Louisiana Highway 3231 (LA 3231) ran  in an east–west direction along Jefferson Paige Road from I-220 to the concurrent US 79 and US 80 in Shreveport, Caddo Parish.

The route was a short connector between US 79-80 and a diamond interchange with I-220, returned to local control after a reconstruction and realignment project in the 2000s.

Louisiana Highway 3232

Louisiana Highway 3233

Louisiana Highway 3233 (LA 3233) runs  in an east–west direction along Harry Guilbeau Road from LA 182 to the concurrent I-49 and US 167 south of Opelousas, St. Landry Parish.

Louisiana Highway 3234

Louisiana Highway 3234 (LA 3234) runs  in an east–west direction from a local road west of Hammond to LA 1065 in Hammond, Tangipahoa Parish.  The route connects Southeastern Louisiana University with I-55 at Exit 32.

From the west, LA 3234 begins on Wardline Road, an undivided two-lane thoroughfare, at its intersection with Randall Road.  The route heads due east and immediately passes through a diamond interchange with I-55.  LA 3234 continues onto University Avenue as an undivided four-lane highway with a center turning lane and intersects US 51 (North Morrison Boulevard) upon entering the Hammond city limits.  It then bisects the SLU campus and passes the school's University Center arena.  After crossing the Canadian National Railway (CN) line at grade, the route proceeds a short distance further to a T-intersection at LA 1065 (North Cherry Street).

Louisiana Highway 3235

Louisiana Highway 3235 (LA 3235) runs  in a north–south direction from LA 1 south of Golden Meadow to LA 24 in Larose, Lafourche Parish.  The route is a four-lane bypass and truck route of LA 1, which passes through various communities situated on the west bank of Bayou Lafourche.

LA 3235 splits off of LA 1 and heads north briefly as an undivided three-lane highway with one northbound lane and two southbound lanes. Upon entering Golden Meadow, however, it widens to a divided four-lane highway. LA 3235 proceeds north and passes through the communities of Galliano and Cutoff with LA 3162 and LA 3161 serving as connectors to LA 1 at these respective locations. Shortly after intersecting LA 657, a truck route connecting to a bridge across Bayou Lafourche, the highway reaches its end at a T-intersection with LA 24, connecting to Houma via Bourg.

Louisiana Highway 3237

Louisiana Highway 3238

Louisiana Highway 3238 (LA 3238) ran  in a north–south direction along Palmisano Boulevard from LA 46 to LA 39 in Chalmette, St. Bernard Parish.

The route was a short connector between LA 46 (East St. Bernard Highway) and LA 39 (East Judge Perez Drive) that handled traffic associated with Chalmette High School.  It was an undivided two-lane highway, widening to accommodate a median immediately south of LA 39.  LA 3238 was transferred to local control in 2014.

Louisiana Highway 3239

Louisiana Highway 3239 ran 3.18 miles in a Northeast-Southwest direction between LA 4 and LA 126 in Caldwell Parish.

From the western terminus at LA-126, LA-3239 ran 1.7 miles East-Northeast to an intersection with Buckskin Rd, where it turned left and ran 1.48 miles Northward to its northern/eastern terminus at LA-4.

Except for a very short concurrency with a paved local road, the entire route was gravel during its time as a State highway. The route was paved in 2019 and transferred to local control, as part of LA DOTD's "right-sizing" road transfer program.

Louisiana Highway 3242

Louisiana Highway 3245

Louisiana Highway 3245 (LA 3245) ran  in a north–south direction along O'Neal Lane from a local road south of I-12 to a junction with US 190 in Baton Rouge, East Baton Rouge Parish.

The route headed north on O'Neal Lane from its intersection with South Harrell's Ferry Road.  After , LA 3245 passed the Baton Rouge campus of Ochsner Medical Center immediately followed by a diamond interchange with I-12 at Exit 7.  The highway proceeded north and intersected LA 426 (Old Hammond Highway) before reaching its terminus at US 190 (Florida Boulevard) opposite the Central Throughway.  LA 3245 was an undivided four-lane highway with a center turning lane for its entire length.

The route was deleted in 2018 as part of the La DOTD's Road Transfer program.

Louisiana Highway 3246

Louisiana Highway 3246 (LA 3246) runs  in a north–south direction along Siegen Lane from LA 42 south of Baton Rouge to the concurrent US 61 and LA 73 in Baton Rouge, East Baton Rouge Parish.

The route begins at an intersection at which LA 42 turns east from Burbank Drive onto Highland Road.  LA 3246 heads north on Siegen Lane, the continuation of Burbank Drive, initially as a divided four-lane highway through a suburban residential area southeast of Baton Rouge.  After intersecting LA 427 (Perkins Road), the highway crosses over the Kansas City Southern Railway (KCS) line and passes through a diamond interchange with I-10 at Exit 163.  LA 3246, now a primarily commercial thoroughfare, widens to an undivided six-lane highway with a center turning lane for the remainder of its route.  It proceeds northward to its terminus at US 61/LA 73 (Airline Highway) in an area on the Baton Rouge city limits known as Nesser opposite South Sherwood Forest Boulevard. As of 2018, it is under agreement to be removed from the state highway system and transferred to local control.

Louisiana Highway 3247

Louisiana Highway 3247 (LA 3247) runs  in a northwest to southeast direction along Cabot Road from LA 1171 to LA 29 northeast of Ville Platte, Evangeline Parish.  The route is a former alignment of LA 29.

Louisiana Highway 3248

Louisiana Highway 3249

Louisiana Highway 3249 (LA 3249) runs  in a north–south direction from the south I-20 frontage road in West Monroe, Ouachita Parish to the concurrent US 80 and LA 15 just north of the city limits.

The route consists of the state-maintained portion of Well Road running through the partial cloverleaf interchange on I-20 at Exit 112 and connecting with US 80/LA 15.  LA 3249 is an undivided four-lane highway with a center turning lane north of the I-20 interchange and an undivided two-lane highway otherwise.  The LA 3249 designation is not signed, and only the local name (Well Road) is used on the I-20 exit signage.

References

External links
La DOTD State, District, and Parish Maps